Román Viñoly Barreto (8 August 1914 – 20 August 1970) was a Uruguayan-Argentine film director.

Biography
Viñoly Barreto directed 28 feature films between 1947 and 1966 including The Black Vampire, Paper Boats, the 1954 film El Abuelo which starred Enrique Muino and Mecha Ortiz and Esta Es Mi Vida starring Miguel de Molina. His 1958 film Los dioses ajenos was entered into the 8th Berlin International Film Festival. His 1965 film La pérgola de las flores was entered into the 4th Moscow International Film Festival. Two years later, he was a member of the jury of the 5th Moscow International Film Festival. He was also a notable screenwriter, theater and opera director.

Personal life
The director was the father of architect Rafael Viñoly, artist Daniel Viñoly, and Dr. Ana Maria de la Merced Viñoly.  He died in 1970 in Buenos Aires, Argentina.

Selected filmography

References

External links
 
 http://www.citwf.com/person481422.htm

1914 births
1970 deaths
Argentine film directors
Male screenwriters
People from Buenos Aires
People from Montevideo
Uruguayan emigrants to Argentina
Uruguayan film directors
Uruguayan screenwriters
Uruguayan people of Spanish descent
20th-century Argentine screenwriters
20th-century Argentine male writers